Arjun Lal Jingar is an Indian politician of Rajasthan state belonging to the Bharatiya Janata Party. He is an elected member from Kapasan assembly constituency.

Political career
Arjun Lal contested as a representative of Bharatiya Janata Party from the Gangrar constituency of Rajasthan State in 1993, in which he won Amar Chand 31273 votes. In 1998, he had contested as a Bhartiya Janta Party candidate from the Gangrar constituency but lost from 46427 votes from Kaloo Ram Khateek. In 2003, he contested the Bhartiya Janata Party candidate from the Gangrar constituency and won the 56816 votes and beat Kalu Lal Khatik. In 2013, he contested Rajasthan State as Bharatiya Janata Party candidate from Kapasan constituency assembly constituency, in which he R.D. Jawa won by defeating 96190 votes. In 2018, he contested Rajasthan State as the Bhartiya Janta Party candidate from the Kapasan constituency, in which he won by defeating Anandi RAM by 81470 votes.

References

Bharatiya Janata Party politicians from Rajasthan
People from Chittorgarh district
1961 births
Living people
Rajasthani politicians